Cesar Ramos (born June 22, 1984) is an American former professional baseball pitcher and the current pitching coach for the Lehigh Valley IronPigs. He played in Major League Baseball (MLB) for the San Diego Padres, Tampa Bay Rays, Los Angeles Angels of Anaheim, and Texas Rangers. Before playing professionally, Ramos played college baseball at Long Beach State University.

Amateur career
Ramos attended El Rancho High School. In , he went 12–4 with a 2.29 ERA in 19 starts, and in 2005 he went 10–7 with a 2.64 ERA in 18 starts.

Professional career

Draft and Minor Leagues
Ramos was drafted in the first round, with the 35th overall selection, in the 2005 Major League Baseball draft. For Eugene, he went 0–1 with a 6.53 ERA in six games, four starts. While with Fort Wayne he went 3–2 with a 4.19 ERA in seven games started.

In , Ramos pitched for the Lake Elsinore Storm, going 7–8 with a 3.64 ERA in 26 games in 24 starts. Ramos ranked second in the California League and seventh in the organization in ERA. He also led the Storm in innings pitched while rerecording eight quality starts.

Ramos was ranked by Baseball America as the tenth best prospect in the Padres organization in  while going 13–9 with a 3.41 ERA for the San Antonio Missions.

He spent the entire season with the Triple-A Portland Beavers, making 27 starts and one relief appearance. Ramos also finished tied for third in the Pacific Coast League in starts while striking out a career-high 105 batters.

San Diego Padres
In  Ramos split time between the Arizona League Padres, the Lake Elsinore Storm, the Portland Beavers and the San Diego Padres. On September 28,  the Padres announced that Cesar Ramos would be making his first Major League start against his hometown team, the Los Angeles Dodgers. Ramos allowed just one run over five innings against the Dodgers on Tuesday night, but took a no-decision in an eventual 3–1 win. He finished the '09 season 0–1 with a 3.07 ERA in five games, two starts.

Tampa Bay Rays
On December 17, 2010 a deal was finalized that sent Ramos, along with Adam Russell, Brandon Gomes and Cole Figueroa, to the Tampa Bay Rays for Jason Bartlett and a player to be named later. In 2011, Ramos appeared in 59 games, pitching  innings with a 3.92 ERA. He spent much of the next season with the Class AAA Durham Bulls, but he appeared in 17 games for Tampa Bay and registered a 2.10 ERA over 30 innings. In 2013, Ramos threw 52 innings in 48 games with a 4.14 ERA.

In April 2014, Ramos was inserted into the starting rotation in place of Alex Cobb.

Los Angeles Angels of Anaheim
The Rays traded Ramos to the Los Angeles Angels of Anaheim on November 5, 2014, for Mark Sappington. In his lone season with the Angels, Ramos appeared in 65 games out of the bullpen, going 2–1 with a 2.75 ERA, with a 7.4 K/9 and a 2.6 BB/9 in  innings. Ramos was non-tendered after the season by the Angels.

Texas Rangers 
The Texas Rangers signed Ramos to a minor league deal on January 5, 2016. After failing to make the Rangers Opening Day roster, Ramos accepted an assignment to the Triple-A Round Rock Express. He was designated for assignment on July 22, 2016.

Detroit Tigers 
On August 1, 2016 the Tigers signed Ramos to a minor league deal.

Philadelphia Phillies
On January 5, 2017, Ramos signed a minor league contract with the Philadelphia Phillies. He elected free agency on November 6, 2017.

Los Angeles Dodgers
On February 16, 2018 Ramos signed a minor league contract with the Los Angeles Dodgers. He was released on March 30, 2018.

Coaching Career
Ramos was hired for the 2021 season by the Philadelphia Phillies to work with injured pitchers at their Minor League complex in Clearwater, Florida. Ramos was named the pitching coach of the Lehigh Valley IronPigs for the 2022 season.

References

External links

1984 births
Living people
American baseball players of Mexican descent
Baseball players from Los Angeles
Major League Baseball pitchers
San Diego Padres players
Tampa Bay Rays players
Los Angeles Angels players
Texas Rangers players
Long Beach State Dirtbags baseball players
Portland Beavers players
San Antonio Missions players
Lake Elsinore Storm players
Fort Wayne Wizards players
Eugene Emeralds players
Arizona League Padres players
Durham Bulls players
2013 World Baseball Classic players
Naranjeros de Hermosillo players
Round Rock Express players
Toledo Mud Hens players
Lehigh Valley IronPigs players